Napstjært railway halt is a railway halt serving the settlement of Napstjært in Vendsyssel, Denmark.

The halt is located on the Skagensbanen railway line from Skagen to Frederikshavn, between Aalbæk and Jerup stations. The train services are currently operated by the railway company Nordjyske Jernbaner which run frequent local train services between Skagen and Frederikshavn.

History 

The halt was opened in 1890 when the railway started. It was closed in January 2005, but only a year later it opened again with a new platform and a new shelter.

Operations 
The train services are currently operated by the railway company Nordjyske Jernbaner (NJ) which run frequent local train services from Skagen station to Frederikshavn station with onward connections to the rest of Denmark.

See also
List of railway stations in Denmark

References

Bibliography

External links

 Nordjyske Jernbaner – Danish railway company operating in North Jutland Region
 Danske Jernbaner – website with information on railway history in Denmark
 Nordjyllands Jernbaner – website with information on railway history in North Jutland

Railway stations in the North Jutland Region
Railway stations opened in 1890
Railway stations closed in 2005
Railway stations opened in 2006
Railway stations in Denmark opened in the 21st century